Pierre Cérésole (17 August 1879 – 23 October 1945) was a Swiss peace activist and engineer, known primarily as the initiator of workcamps and the founder of the peace organisation Service Civil International (SCI).

Life
Pierre Cérésole was born in Lausanne on 17 August 1879, the son of Paul Cérésole, a member of the Swiss Federal Council and a President of the Swiss Confederation. He studied engineering. From 1910 on he went on long travels and worked as an engineer in the United States and in Japan. In August 1914 he returned to Switzerland during the onset of World War I. He decided to be a Christian conscientious objector and opposed all forms of service in or cooperation with the army. As a pacifist, in 1917 he refused to pay taxes that were used for the acquisition of arms. He spent time in prison because of that.

In 1919, he quit his career as an engineer and devoted his life to peace activism. He participated in the Bilthoven Meetings of peace activists after World War I and during the second conference, he decided to initiate a project where people from different European countries would work together to rebuild the village Esnes-en-Argonne in France, which had been destroyed during the war. This project in 1920 is considered the first workcamp and was a catalysator for the international voluntary service movement.

Together with his brother Ernest and other volunteers he set up the organisation Service Civil Organisation and organised several more volunteering projects in the upcoming years, mostly as relief aid after natural catastrophes, e.g. in Liechtenstein, Switzerland and France.

In 1931, Ceresole met Mahatma Gandhi in Lausanne, while he was staying in Romain Rolland's house in Geneva after having taken part in the Round Table Conferences in London. Ceresole was inspired by Gandhi's thinking, but also disagreed with parts of his non-cooperation approach. While they agreed on refusing to support any military activity by any government, Ceresole was ready to cooperate with governments no matter their ideology on other grounds.

In November 1933, Ceresole crossed the border between Switzerland and Germany in order to meet Adolf Hitler to inquire about the situation in Germany, although the meeting did not take place.

From 1934 and 1937, Cérésole and three other European volunteers were active in the reconstruction of infrastructure in Bihar in India after the 1934 Nepal–India earthquake. In India he joined the Quakers.

Cérésole had been inspired by American thinker William James. Cérésole in turn inspired Kees Boeke.

After Cérésole's death, his friend and peace activist, Hélène Monastier, published his biography and several of his papers.

Recognition
Ceresole was nominated for the Nobel Peace Prize in 1938 and 1939.

Bibliography

See also
 List of peace activists

Sources

References

1879 births
1945 deaths
19th-century Quakers
20th-century Quakers
Converts to Quakerism
Non-interventionism
People from Lausanne
Swiss anti-war activists
Swiss Christian pacifists
Swiss conscientious objectors
Swiss engineers
Swiss Quakers
Swiss tax resisters